Zamłynie may refer to the following places:
Zamłynie, Brzeziny County in Łódź Voivodeship (central Poland)
Zamłynie, Zduńska Wola County in Łódź Voivodeship (central Poland)
Zamłynie, Hrubieszów County in Lublin Voivodeship (east Poland)
Zamłynie, Lesser Poland Voivodeship (south Poland)
Zamłynie, Tomaszów Lubelski County in Lublin Voivodeship (east Poland)
Zamłynie, Masovian Voivodeship (east-central Poland)
Zamłynie, Silesian Voivodeship (south Poland)